Mika Oksa is a Finnish former professional ice hockey goaltender who played in Finland, Sweden and Belarus. In Belarus he played for both Dinamo Minsk and Yunost Minsk.

References

Living people
HC Dinamo Minsk players
HC Shakhtyor Soligorsk players
Finnish ice hockey goaltenders
Year of birth missing (living people)